Gibbs High School is a public high school located in Corryton, Tennessee, United States.

The school was founded in 1913 in a two-story brick building built on 12 acres; it burned down in 1937. The second building burned down 13 years later in 1950. The third and current school is near the intersection of Tazewell Pike and East Emory Road. 

When the new Gibbs Elementary School opened across Tazewell Pike in 2007, the high school began using the old elementary school building as an on-site career and technical education facility. 

Gibbs' principal is Jason Webster.

Notable alumni 
Trevor Bayne, Nascar driver, Daytona 500 winner
Kenny Chesney, country singer, graduated in 1986
Ed Hooper, writer and producer, graduated in 1981
Phil Leadbetter, bluegrass guitarist
Ashley Monroe, country singer, member of the Pistol Annies
Morgan Wallen, country music artist
Dave Wright, politician.

References

Schools in Knox County, Tennessee
Public high schools in Tennessee
1913 establishments in Tennessee